Game Pak is the brand name for ROM cartridges designed by Nintendo for some of their earlier video game systems. The "Game Pak" moniker was officially used only in North America, Europe, and Oceania. In Japan, as well as other Asian territories and Latin America, these cartridges were officially called .

Nintendo Entertainment System

Super Nintendo Entertainment System

Nintendo 64

Game Boy 

All cartridges, excluding those for Game Boy Advance, measure 5.8 by 6.5 cm. The cartridge provides the code and game data to the console's CPU. Some cartridges include a small battery with SRAM, flash memory chip, or EEPROM, which allows game data to be saved when the console is turned off. If the battery runs out in a cartridge, then the save data will be lost, however, it is possible to replace the battery with a new battery. To do this, the cartridge must be unscrewed, opened up, and the old battery would be removed and replaced. This may require desoldering the dead battery and soldering the replacement in place. Before 2003, Nintendo used round, flat watch batteries for saving information on the cartridges. These batteries were replaced in newer cartridges because they could only live for a certain amount of time.

The cartridge is inserted into the console cartridge slot. If the cartridge is removed while the power is on, and the Game Boy does not automatically reset, the game freezes; the Game Boy may exhibit unexpected behavior, such as rows of zeros appearing on the screen, the sound remaining at the same pitch as was emitted the instant the game was pulled out, saved data may be corrupted, and hardware may be damaged. This applies to most video game consoles that use cartridges.

The original Game Boy power switch was designed to prevent the player from being able to remove the cartridge while the power is on. Cartridges intended only for Game Boy Color (and not for the original Game Boy) lack the "notch" for the locking mechanism present in the top of the original cartridges, preventing operation on an original Game Boy (the cartridge can be inserted, but the power switch cannot be moved to the "on" position). Even if this was bypassed by using a Game Boy Pocket, Game Boy Light, or Super Game Boy, and Super Game Boy 2, the game would not run, and an image on the screen would inform the user that the game is only compatible with Game Boy Color systems. One exception would be the Kirby Tilt 'n' Tumble game: despite the game cartridge featuring a notch, enabling it to be inserted on the original Game Boy, the game displays an error message indicating that it only plays on Game Boy Color. Chee Chai Alien and Pocket Music are incompatible with Game Boy Advance models, displaying an error message indicating that they only play on Game Boy Color.

Game Boy Advance cartridges used a similar physical lock-out feature. Notches were located at the base of the cartridge's two back corners. One of these notches was placed as to avoid pressing a switch inside the cartridge slot to help stabilize it. When an older Game Boy or Game Boy Color game was inserted into the cartridge slot, the switch would be pressed down and the Game Boy Advance would start in Game Boy Color mode, while a Game Boy Advance cartridge would not touch the switch and the system would start in Game Boy Advance mode. The Nintendo DS replaced the switch with a solid piece of plastic that would allow Game Boy Advance cartridges to be inserted into Slot 2, but would prevent an older Game Boy or Game Boy Color cartridge from being inserted fully into the slot.

Excluding game-specific variations, there are four types of cartridges compatible with Game Boy systems:

Grey cartridges 

Grey cartridges (also known as class A) are compatible with all Game Boy systems, excluding Game Boy Micro. All original Game Boy games are of this type. Some of these cartridges are in alternative colors, such as red or blue for Pokémon Red and Blue, and yellow for the Donkey Kong Land series. The games on these cartridges are programmed in black and white; the Game Boy Color and later systems provide selectable color palettes for them. Some grey cartridges that were released between 1994 and 1998 have Super Game Boy enhancements. Even fewer grey cartridges were released with built-in features that made them protrude from the slot, but included the notch to be compatible with the original Game Boy (notably the Game Boy Camera).

Black cartridges 

Black cartridges (also known as class B or Dual Mode) are compatible with all Game Boy systems, excluding Game Boy Micro. Although the games on these cartridges are programmed in color, they can still be played in monochrome on Game Boy, Game Boy Pocket, Game Boy Light and Super Game Boy (and its Japanese follow-up). Examples of black-cartridge games are Pokémon Yellow: Special Pikachu Edition, Pokémon Gold and Silver (however, the actual colors of these three cartridges are yellow, gold, and silver, respectively). Games such as Wario Land II and The Legend of Zelda: Link's Awakening DX were full-color re-releases of gray-cartridge games but with additional content only available on the Game Boy Color. Some black cartridges have Super Game Boy enhancements. Even some games had built-in features similar to what the later clear cartridges did, like rumble features (Pokémon Pinball) and infrared receiver (Robopon Sun, Star, and Moon Versions).

Clear cartridges 

Clear cartridges (also known as class C) are compatible with Game Boy Color and the Game Boy Advance systems, excluding Game Boy Micro. Some games (such as Pokémon Crystal) were released in specially colored cartridges, as had been done before, but the new colors remained translucent. Some clear cartridges have built-in features, including rumble features (Perfect Dark) and tilt sensors (Kirby Tilt 'n' Tumble). These cartridges are a slightly different shape from the earlier varieties, and would obstruct the latch if inserted into the original Game Boy. Unlike the Gray cartridges and Black cartridges, the Clear cartridges cannot be played on a Game Boy Pocket, a Game Boy Light or on Super Game Boy (or even its Japanese follow-up). Some class C cartridges (European version of V-Rally: Championship Edition) used a solid cartridge design, like in Class B.

Advance cartridges 

Advance cartridges (also known as class D) are half the size of all earlier cartridges and are compatible with Game Boy Advance and later systems including the Nintendo DS. Some cartridges are colored to resemble the game (usually for the Pokémon series; Pokémon Emerald, for example, being a clear emerald green). Some Advance cartridges have built-in features, including rumble features (Drill Dozer), tilt sensors (WarioWare: Twisted!, Yoshi's Universal Gravitation) and solar sensors (Boktai).

References

Nintendo hardware
Video game storage media